Raymond Molyneux (13 June 1930 – October 2014) was an English professional footballer who played as an outside right.

Career
Born in Kearsley, Molyneux joined Bradford City from Ashton United in December 1948. He made 2 league appearances for the club, scoring once. He left the club in February 1953 to join Bournemouth & Boscombe Athletic, and later also played for Oswestry Town. He then signed for Mossley making 32 appearances and scoring 4 goals in the 1955–56 season.

Sources

References

1930 births
2014 deaths
English footballers
Ashton United F.C. players
Bradford City A.F.C. players
AFC Bournemouth players
Oswestry Town F.C. players
English Football League players
Association football outside forwards
Mossley A.F.C. players